Norfolk—Haldimand was a federal electoral district represented in the House of Commons of Canada from 1968 to 1979. It was located in the province of Ontario. This riding was created in 1966 from parts of Brant—Haldimand and Norfolk ridings.

It consisted of the County of Norfolk (excluding the Town of Tillsonburg), and, in the County of Haldimand, the Village of Hagersville and the Townships of North Cayuga, South Cayuga, Oneida, Rainham, Seneca and Walpole (excluding parts lying within the Six Nations Indian Reserve No. 40 and New Credit Indian Reserve No. 40A).

The electoral district was abolished in 1976 when it was redistributed between Haldimand—Norfolk and Oxford ridings.

Members of Parliament

This riding has elected the following Members of Parliament:

Election results

|- 
  
|Progressive Conservative
|William David Knowles   
|align="right"| 14,908    
  
|Liberal
|Jack Roxburgh    
|align="right"| 13,132   
 
|New Democratic
|Lois M. Stuart  
|align="right"|3,441   
|}

|- 
  
|Progressive Conservative
|William David Knowles 
|align="right"|21,214    
  
|Liberal
|David Marshall  
|align="right"| 14,106   
 
|New Democratic
|Ede Pos  
|align="right"| 3,116   

|}

|- 
  
|Progressive Conservative
|William David Knowles  
|align="right"| 17,867    
  
|Liberal
|David Marshall 
|align="right"| 15,604   
 
|New Democratic
|Norm Walpole 
|align="right"| 3,426   
|}

See also 

 List of Canadian federal electoral districts
 Historical federal electoral districts of Canada

External links 

 Website of the Parliament of Canada

Former federal electoral districts of Ontario
Haldimand County
Norfolk County, Ontario